The Olympic Conference is an athletic conference consisting of public and private high schools located in Burlington County, Camden County and Gloucester County, New Jersey. The Olympic Conference operates under the aegis of the New Jersey State Interscholastic Athletic Association. All schools that sponsor a football program are members of the West Jersey Football League.

History
Timber Creek Regional High School announced in 2018 that they would leave the Olympic Conference and join the Tri-County Conference for the 2020-21 school year, which would have the benefit of having all three schools in the Black Horse Pike District competing in the same athletic conference.

Participating schools

Notes

External links
Olympic Conference
South Jersey Sports high school list
Courier Post Varsity Sports - South Jersey

Education in Burlington County, New Jersey
Education in Camden County, New Jersey
Education in Gloucester County, New Jersey
New Jersey high school athletic conferences